Down Here on the Ground is an album by the jazz guitarist Wes Montgomery, released in 1968. It reached number one on the Billboard Jazz album chart and number 4 on the R&B chart. It also reached number 38 on the Billboard 200.

The song "Down Here on the Ground" is Montgomery's version of the theme song from the movie Cool Hand Luke, by Lalo Schifrin.

Reception 

In his AllMusic review, Michael G. Nastos wrote: "The arrangements of Don Sebesky are for the most part pretty, unobtrusive, and pleasant but lack groove and soul in the main… In many real and important ways, this is the beginning of the end for Montgomery as a jazz artist, and the inception of bachelor pad lounge/mood music that only lasted for a brief time. This recording, with no extra material, alternate takes, or bonus tracks, cannot compare to Charlie Parker with strings. It does fall in that category of recordings where the musicians chose to produce, rather than create their personal brand of jazz, and is at the very least an historical footnote."

Track listing 
 "Wind Song" (Herb Alpert, Nick Ceroli, Neil Larsen, John Pisano, Paul Francis Webster) – 2:22
 "Georgia on My Mind" (Hoagy Carmichael, Stuart Gorrell) – 2:46
 "The Other Man's Grass Is Always Greener" (Tony Hatch, Jackie Trent) – 2:36
 "Down Here on the Ground" (Lalo Schifrin, Gale Garnett) – 3:42
 "Up and at It" (Wes Montgomery) – 4:15
 "Goin' on to Detroit" (Montgomery) – 3:38
 "I Say a Little Prayer for You" (Burt Bacharach, Hal David) – 3:18
 "When I Look in Your Eyes" (Leslie Bricusse) – 3:11
 "Know It All (Quem Diz Que Sabe)" (João Donato, Paulo Valle) – 2:59
 "The Fox" (Lalo Schifrin) – 2:56

Personnel
Wes Montgomery – guitar
Herbie Hancock – piano
Ron Carter – bass
Grady Tate – drums
Ray Barretto – percussion
Hubert Laws – flute, oboe
George Marge – flute, oboe
Romeo Penque – flute, oboe
Bobby Rosengarden – percussion
Mike Mainieri – vibraphone
Gene Orloff – violin
Raoul Poliakin – violin
George Ricci – cello
Emanuel Vardi – viola
Production notes:
Creed Taylor – producer
Don Sebesky – arranger, conductor
Rudy Van Gelder – engineer
Kevin Reeves – mastering
John Synder – remastering
Pete Turner – cover photo, photography
Isabelle Wong – design
Sam Antupit – design
Hollis King – art direction
Andy Kman – production coordinator
Harry Weinger – reissue supervisor

Chart positions

References

1968 albums
Wes Montgomery albums
Albums produced by Creed Taylor
A&M Records albums
Albums recorded at Van Gelder Studio
Albums arranged by Don Sebesky
Albums conducted by Don Sebesky